Alor is the largest island in the Alor Archipelago and is one of the 92 officially listed outlying islands of Indonesia. It is located at the eastern Lesser Sunda Islands that runs through southeastern Indonesia, which from the west include such islands as Bali, Lombok, Sumbawa, Komodo, and Flores.

To the east of the island across the Ombai Strait lie the islands of Wetar and Atauro, the latter belonging to East Timor. To the south, across the Strait of Alor, lies the western part of Timor. To the north lies the Banda Sea. To the west lies Pantar and the other islands of the Alor archipelago, and further yet the rest of the Sunda Islands.

Alor Island, as well as the rest of its archipelago, is part of East Nusa Tenggara province.

Geography
Alor has an area of about 2,125 km2, making it the largest island of the Alor archipelago. Kalabahi is the only town on the island of Alor, with an estimated population of 53,807 in mid 2021. The variety of goods obtainable in Kalabahi is surprising considering its size and location.  The 2010 census recorded the population of the island as 145,299 out of 190,000 in the regency. The 2020 census produced a total of 163,377, and the official estimate as at mid 2021 was 165,164.

Alor is of volcanic origin and has very rugged terrain. The region near Kalabahi is the only flat area. This may be why the Dutch chose the location as the capital and main harbor (Alor-Kecil) in 1911.

On 12 November 2004, an earthquake occurred, killing 34 people, and injuring 400. The shock had a moment magnitude of 7.5 and a maximum Mercalli intensity of VIII (Severe).

Economy 

The island's infrastructure is only weakly built. The inhabitants practice mainly subsistence agriculture. In the villages, vanilla, tamarind, almonds (Canarium) and other nuts are cultivated. In the forests sandalwood is cut down for trade.

The latest geological explorations have discovered valuable resources such as gypsum, kaolin, petroleum, natural gas, tin, gold, and diamonds. Alor's snorkelling and diving may promise an increase in tourism in the future. Alor hosts some of the most healthy and diverse corals in Indonesia and has areas of black volcanic sand for specialized scuba diving interests.

Religion 
211,872 people lived on Alor and Pantar in 2020. 68.46% were Protestants, 25.65% Muslims and 3.04% Roman Catholics (in a few villages). Animistic rites and traditions are still strongly practiced.

Language 

The majority of the more than fifteen indigenous languages spoken on Alor belong to the Papuan (non-Austronesian) family of Alor languages. These include Abui, Adang, Hamap, Kabola, Kafoa, Woisika, Kelon, and Kui. In addition, Alorese is a Malayo-Polynesian language which is spoken along the coast of the western and southern Bird's Head of Alor Island and in places on surrounding islands.

Many of the Papuan languages of Alor are endangered and are no longer being actively acquired by children. Some languages have fewer than 1000 speakers remaining. Significant linguistic documentation efforts have been undertaken recently by Leiden University. The language of daily communication is Alor Malay, a unique Malay variety with some similarities to Kupang Malay. Indonesian is taught in schools and used widely in media.

Transportation
Alor is served by Alor Mali Airport (ARD). The airport is small, and all incoming and outgoing flights are thus via Kupang Airport (KOE). Alor is serviced 3–4 times daily by both Lion Air (Wings) and NAM Air. Flights originating in Bali, Surabaya or Jakarta with the final destination of Alor stop in Kupang to change planes. There are no direct services from Labuan Bajo, Ende, Maumere or Makassar.

See also

 List of islands of Indonesia

References

External links 

 Alor and Pantar Languages Project
 Hans Hägerdal (2010) "Cannibals and pedlars: Economic opportunity and political alliance in Alor, 1600-1850", Indonesia and the Malay World 38 (111).
 Van Galen's Memorandum on the Alor Islands in 1946, part 1
 Van Galen's Memorandum on the Alor Islands in 1946, part 2
 Alor Surga di Timur Matahari part I
 Alor Surga di Timur Matahari part II

Alor Archipelago
Populated places in Indonesia